James W. Whitehead (1870–1929) was an English footballer who played at both professional and international levels as an inside right.

Career
Born in Church, Lancashire, Whitehead played in the Football League for Accrington, Blackburn Rovers and Manchester City. He also earned two caps for the English national side between 1893 and 1894.

References

External links

1870 births
1929 deaths
Association football inside forwards
English footballers
England international footballers
Accrington F.C. players
Blackburn Rovers F.C. players
Manchester City F.C. players
Accrington Stanley F.C. (1891) players
English Football League players